Trygort  is a village in the administrative district of Gmina Węgorzewo, within Węgorzewo County, Warmian-Masurian Voivodeship, in north-eastern Poland. It is located on the northern shore of Lake Mamry in the region of Masuria, close to the border with the Kaliningrad Oblast of Russia.

The village was founded in 1452.

References

Populated lakeshore places in Poland
Villages in Węgorzewo County
1452 establishments in Europe
Populated places established in the 1450s